Louw Venter (born 16 August 1975), is a South African actor and filmmaker. He is best known for his directorial and writing roles in the popular films The Tree, Konfetti and Swartwater.

Personal life
He was born on 16 August 1975 in Cape Town, South Africa.

Career
In 2001, he made film debut with Final Solution where he made a minor role as a 'Paramilitary member'. In 2002, he played a supportive role 'Marco' in the Italian film The Piano Player directed by Jean-Pierre Roux. In 2003, he starred in two films: Adrenaline and Citizen Verdict.

Apart from acting, he is also a scriptwriter who wrote the critically acclaimed award-winning film Konfetti which was directed by Zaheer Goodman-Bhyat. Apart from that, he was the writer of television serials: Rugby Motors and Vinkel & Koljander. In 2015, he made directorial debut with the short film Leemte. After the success of the film, he made the television serial Vinkel & Koljander in 2016. In 2016, he became famous with the feature film Kalushi: The Story of Solomon Mahlangu, which was based on a true story. In the film, he played a supportive role of 'Van Heerden'. The film was a critical success and awarded at several film festivals.

Venter also formed a comedy duo with fellow South African comedian Rob van Vuuren. The two appeared as characters Corne (Venter) and Twakkie (Van Vuuren) in a series of YouTube videos and a program called The Most Amazing Show. Venter also played Van Vuuren's brother in the comedy Van der Merwe in 2017.

In 2020, he directed and wrote his maiden feature film Stam which was released on DStv's BoxOffice in October. The film had its worldwide premiere at the Durban International Film Festival in September 2020. It also premiered at the 18th Tofifest International Film Festival 2020 in Poland. The film won the Best South African Film Award at the 2020 Durban International Festival (DIFF).

Partial filmography

See also
 Zef
 Proesstraat

References

External links
 

Living people
South African male television actors
1982 births
South African male film actors